Pateros Schools District (officially known as Pateros Cluster of Schools) is a distinction of schools located in the Municipality of Pateros, Metropolitan Manila. It determine the functions and delineation of positions in the school division offices and schools, including the school district supervisors, education supervisors and school heads.

Overview 
The Pateros Schools District is under the Schools Division of Taguig City and Pateros (SDO-TAPAT) which is the geographic division of field office of the Department of Education which covers the City of Taguig and Municipality of Pateros as its jurisdiction. The whole cluster or district is guided by the District Supervisor under the governance of the Schools Division Superintendent.

The Schools District Office is located inside of Pateros Elementary School's Gabaldon Hall.

List of Schools in Pateros 
Elementary

 Aguho Elementary School
 Captain Hipolito Francisco Elementary School
 Captain Hipolito Francisco Elementary School-Annex
 Paulina Manalo Elementary School
 Pateros Elementary School
 Sta. Ana Elementary School
 Sto. Rosario Elementary School

High School

 Maria Concepcion Cruz High School
 Mayor Simplicio Manalo National High School
 Pateros National High School

Private Schools

 APEC Schools
 Huckleberry Montessori School
 Maranatha Christian Academy, Inc.
 Pateros Catholic School
 Saint Genevieve School of Pateros, Inc.
 SEP Christian School, Inc.

References

Education in Metro Manila
Pateros